Charlotte Layne Grant (born 20 September 2001) is an Australian professional women's footballer who plays as a defender for Vittsjö GIK in the Damallsvenskan and for Australia women's national soccer team internationally.

Club career
In October 2018, Grant signed for Adelaide United along with United States international, Amber Brooks.

She made her Adelaide debut on 18 November 2018, being replaced by Fanndís Friðriksdóttir in a 1–0 win over Brisbane Roar.

In April 2021, Grant went overseas, joining Swedish Damallsvenskan club Rosengård.

International career
In September 2021, Grant made her debut for the Australian senior team in a friendly against the Republic of Ireland.

Grant was a member of the Matildas Tokyo 2020 Olympics squad. The Matildas qualified for the quarter-finals and beat Great Britain before being eliminated in the semi-final with Sweden. In the playoff for the bronze medal they were beaten by the USA.

Career statistics

Club 

1Swedish Cup.
2UEFA Women's Champions League

International

References

External links
 

2001 births
Living people
Adelaide United FC (A-League Women) players
FC Rosengård players
A-League Women players
Women's association football defenders
Australian women's soccer players
Footballers at the 2020 Summer Olympics
Olympic soccer players of Australia
Australia women's international soccer players
Vittsjö GIK players
Soccer players from Adelaide
Australian expatriate sportspeople in Sweden
Australian expatriate women's soccer players
Expatriate women's footballers in Sweden